Rebirth of a Nation is a collaborative studio album by American hip hop group Public Enemy and rapper/producer Paris. Its title is a reference to the 1915 white supremacist film The Birth of a Nation as well as one of the group's prior albums, It Takes a Nation of Millions to Hold Us Back. Despite the Public Enemy branding on the album, many tracks were written and produced by Paris; the album itself was deemed a "special project" by Chuck D in order to differentiate it from other Public Enemy works. It was released on March 7, 2006 through Guerrilla Funk Recordings with distribution via Caroline Distribution. The album was mixed and mastered at Data Stream Studio in San Francisco, California. The album features guest appearances from Dead Prez, MC Ren, Kam, Sister Souljah, The Conscious Daughters, Immortal Technique and Professor Griff. Rebirth of a Nation peaked at number 180 on the Billboard 200 albums chart in the United States and sold 5,592 units in its first week out.

Track listing

Chart history

References

External links

Rebirth Of A Nation on Guerrilla Funk Recordings

2006 albums
Public Enemy (band) albums
Paris (rapper) albums
Collaborative albums